L. Alex Wilson (1909–1960) was an American journalist and editor who rose to prominence during the civil rights movement.  He covered the Emmett Till murder for the African-American oriented, Chicago Defender chain, while serving as the editor of the Memphis-based Tri-State Defender.  In 1957, Wilson was covering the Little Rock Nine school desegregation crises when a white mob beat and injured him.  He recovered, and continued as an editor in Chicago, but the wounds he received in Little Rock likely shortened his life.

Biography
Lucious Alexander Wilson was the editor and general manager of the Tri-State Defender, an African-American newspaper published in Memphis, Tennessee. The Tri-State was then part of the influential Chicago Defender chain.  In 1955, Wilson led the Defender-chain's coverage of the Emmett Till lynching, a catalyst for the civil rights movement. One of the people he hired at the Tri-State Defender was Dorothy Butler Gilliam. 

Wilson gained national attention when television images of him being beaten by a White mob were broadcast during his coverage of the Little Rock Nine finally entering Little Rock Central High School on September 23, 1957. Wilson, a highly visible presence at 6'3", followed the black students to the school building until members of the racist mob started to attack him. He decided to walk, not run, away. After having been confronted by members of the KKK when he was younger and fleeing, he decided he would never run from racism ever again. A member of the mob hopped on his back and started choking him, and another one hit him in the head with a brick. 

After the events in Little Rock, Wilson became editor of The Chicago Defender, but he died young, in 1960 (at the age of 51), possibly from the effects of the beatings he endured.

Further reading
 poetry.

References

1960 deaths
African-American journalists
1909 births
Little Rock Nine